

Events calendar

10